Andrea Esteban Catalán is a Spanish former football striker who mainly played for Levante UD in Spain's Primera División. She is currently the manager of Primera División (women) side Valencia.

She was a member of the Spain Under-17 team that won its second U-17 European Championship in April 2011, but she was seriously injured in the first match and missed the rest of the tournament.

With only 23 years old, Esteban announced her retirement after five surgeries.

References

External links
Profile at Txapeldunak.com 

1996 births
Living people
Spanish women's footballers
Primera División (women) players
Levante UD Femenino players
Valencia CF Femenino players
Valencia CF Femenino managers
Women's association football forwards
Spanish football managers
Primera División (women) managers